The Nokota horse is a feral and semi-feral horse breed located in the badlands of southwestern North Dakota in the United States. The breed developed in the 19th century from foundation bloodstock consisting of ranch-bred horses produced from the horses of local Native Americans mixed with Spanish horses, Thoroughbreds, harness horses and related breeds. The Nokota was almost wiped out during the early 20th century when ranchers, in cooperation with state and federal agencies, worked together to reduce competition for livestock grazing. However, when Theodore Roosevelt National Park was created in the 1940s, a few bands were inadvertently trapped inside, and thus were preserved.

In 1986, the park sold off many horses, including herd stallions, and released several stallions with outside bloodlines into the herds. At this point, brothers Leo and Frank Kuntz began purchasing the horses with the aim of preserving the breed, and founded the Nokota Horse Conservancy in 1999, later beginning a breed registry through the same organization. Later, a second, short-lived, registry was begun by another organization in Minnesota. In 2009, the North Dakota Badlands Horse Registry was created, which registers the slightly different type of horses which have been removed from the park in recent years. Today, the park conducts regular thinning of the herd to keep numbers between 70 and 110, and the excess horses are sold off.

The Nokota horse has an angular frame, is commonly blue roan in color, and often exhibits an ambling gait called the "Indian shuffle". The breed is generally separated into two sections, the traditional and the ranch type, which differ slightly in conformation and height. They are used in many events, including endurance riding, western riding and English disciplines.

Breed characteristics 

The Nokota horse has an angular frame with prominent withers, a sloped croup, and a low set tail. Members of the breed are often blue roan, which is a color rare in other breeds, although black and gray are also common. Less common colors include red roan, bay, chestnut, dun, grullo and palomino. Pinto patterns such as overo and sabino occur occasionally. 

There are two general types of the Nokota horse. The first is the traditional Nokota, known by the registry as the National Park Traditional. Members of the breed often exhibit an ambling gait, once known as the "Indian shuffle." Nokota horses are described as versatile and intelligent. Members of the breed have been used in endurance racing and western riding, and a few have been used in events such as fox hunting, dressage, three-day eventing and show jumping. Sources vary on the etymology of the breed's name, with one source stating that the Nokota derives its name from the Nakota people who inhabited North and South Dakota, while another says that the name was a combination of North Dakota created by the Kuntz brothers.

History 
The Nokota horse developed in the southwestern corner of North Dakota, in the Little Missouri River Badlands. Feral horses were first encountered by ranchers in the 19th century, and horses from domestic herds mingled with the original feral herds. Ranchers often crossbred local Indian ponies, Spanish horses from the southwest, and various draft, harness, Thoroughbred and stock horses to make hardy, useful ranch horses. Theodore Roosevelt, who ranched in the Little Missouri area between 1883 and 1886, wrote:

In a great many —indeed in most— localities there are wild horses to be found, which, although invariably of domestic descent, being either themselves runaways from some ranch or Indian outfit, or else claiming such for their sires and dams, yet are quite as wild as the antelope on whose domain they have intruded.

In 1884, the HT Ranch, located near Medora, North Dakota, bought 60 mares from a herd of 250 Native American-bred horses originally confiscated from the Lakota leader Sitting Bull and sold at Fort Buford, North Dakota in 1881. Some of these mares were bred to the Thoroughbred racing stallion Lexington, also owned by the HT Ranch.

By the early 20th century, the feral horse herds became the target of local ranchers looking to limit grazing competition for their livestock. Many horses were rounded up, and either used as ranch horses, sold for slaughter, or shot. From the 1930s through the 1950s, federal and state agencies worked with ranchers to remove horses from western North Dakota.  However, when Theodore Roosevelt National Park was established in the 1940s, during construction, a few bands of horses were accidentally enclosed within the Park fence, and by 1960 these bands were the last remaining feral horses in North Dakota. Nonetheless, the park sought to eliminate these horses. The National Park Service was declared exempt from the Wild and Free-Roaming Horses and Burros Act of 1971 that covered free-roaming horses and burros on other federal lands. This allowed them to view the herds as nuisances and deal with them as such, including sending many to slaughter.

In the late 1970s, growing public opposition to the removal of feral horses prompted management strategy changes, and today the herds within the Theodore Roosevelt National Park are managed for the purposes of historical demonstration. However, in 1986 the park added outside bloodlines with the aim of modifying the appearance of the Nokota. Park management felt that the horses created with the outside bloodlines would sell better at subsequent auctions. The dominant herd stallions were removed and replaced with two feral stallions from Bureau of Land Management Mustang herds, a crossbred Shire stallion, a Quarter Horse stallion and an Arabian stallion. At the same time that the stallion replacements took place, many horses from the park were rounded up and sold. At the 1986 auction, concerned about the welfare of the Nokota horse, Leo and Frank Kuntz purchased 54 horses, including the dominant stallion, a blue roan. This was in addition to smaller numbers of horses purchased in 1981, 1991 and 1997. After researching the history of the breed, the Kuntzs stated that they had found evidence that the horses in the park were probably related to the remaining horses from the band of 250 Sitting Bull horses, who had been range-bred by the Marquis de Mores, who founded the town of Medora. However, the short-lived Nokota Horse Association stated that there was no evidence for this claim.

1990s to today 
By 1993, the Kuntz brothers had a herd of 150 horses, including those purchased from the park over the course of several auctions and their descendants. They used the horses mainly for ranching and endurance races. In 1993, the Nokota was declared the Honorary State Equine of the state of North Dakota. In 1994, researchers conducted a study of the horses in the park and on the Kuntz's ranch, and discovered that none of the horses in the park, and only about 20 on the ranch, had characteristics consistent with the Colonial Spanish Horse. Since then, the horses on the Kuntz ranch have been bred to maintain and improve their Spanish characteristics. In 1999, the Kuntz brothers founded the Nokota Horse Conservancy to protect and conserve the Nokota horse. The Nokota Horse Conservancy  tracks around 1,000 living and dead horses, and Nokota horses can be found throughout the United States.

Theodore Roosevelt National Park has continued thinning the herd, with several roundups conducted throughout the 1990s and first decade of the 21st century. In 2000, the last horses to be considered of "traditional" Nokota type was removed from the wild, with some being purchased by supporters of the Nokota Horse Conservancy. The National Park Service currently maintains a herd of 70 to 110 horses. In 2006, the breed was chosen to be the beneficiary of Breyer Animal Creations' annual "Benefit Horse" Campaign for the following year; a Breyer model was created, manufactured, and marketed in 2007, with a portion of the proceeds going to the Nokota Horse Conservancy. As of 2006, the Kuntz family owned approximately 500 Nokota horses, with the Nokota Horse Conservancy owning an additional 40. At that point, there were less than 1,000 living Nokotas in the world.

The Nokota Horse Registry is the breed registry, organized by the Nokota Horse Conservancy. There was briefly a second registry: a Minnesota-based organization called the Nokota Horse Association.  In October 2009, the two registries disputed which had the right to the Nokota breed name, with the Association claiming that they own the legal trademark to the name. The Registry sued, contending that they created the name and had a longer history with the breed. A US District Court ordered that the Association cease registering horses until the matter was settled, and the association disappeared from public view soon after. In the fall of 2009, another organization, the North Dakota Badlands Horse Registry, was created. This organization registers horses that have been removed from the park in recent years, stating that these horses are not accepted by the Nokota Horse Registry.  As of March 2011, approximately 40 horses had been registered. These horses tend to be of a slightly different phenotype and genotype than the horses registered by the Nokota Horse Registry due to the additional blood from different breeds released into the park.

References

External links 
 Nokota Horse Conservancy

Horse breeds
Horse breeds originating in the United States
Horse landraces
Horse breeds originating from Indigenous Americans
Feral horses